The Hat Box Mystery is a 1947 mystery film directed by Lambert Hillyer and starring Tom Neal, Pamela Blake and Allen Jenkins. It was produced as a featurette for release by Robert L. Lippert's Screen Guild Productions. It was shot at the General Service Studios in Hollywood. The film's sets were designed by the art director William Glasgow.

Synopsis
Susan Hart, the secretary and fiancée of private detective  Russ Ashton takes a case in his absence. Given a hat box by her client with a hidden camera inside she is told to take a photograph of his wife so he can begin divorce proceedings. Instead when she opens the box the woman is shot dead and she finds herself accused of murder.

Cast
 Tom Neal as Russ Ashton
 Pamela Blake as Susan Hart
 Allen Jenkins as 	'Harvard'
 Virginia Sale as Veronica Hoopler
 Leonard Penn as Stevens
 Olga Andre as Marie Moreland
 Tom Kennedy as Police Officer Murphy
 Al Hill as Flint
 Edward Keane as District Attorney
 Zon Murray as 	Joe
 Bob Nunes as 	Witness
 Jack Cheatham as 	Policeman

References

Bibliography
 Pitts, Michael R. Famous Movie Detectives II. Scarecrow Press, 1991.

External links
 

1947 films
1947 mystery films
American mystery films
Films directed by Lambert Hillyer
American black-and-white films
Lippert Pictures films
Films set in New York City
1940s English-language films
1940s American films